Pyhävesi is a medium-sized lake located in the southeast of Finland. The nearest town is Mäntyharju to the south. It belongs to Kymijoki main catchment area and to region Kymenlaakso.

See also
List of lakes in Finland

References

Kymenlaakso
Lakes of Mäntyharju